John F. Gorman  (1859–1889), nicknamed "Stooping Jack", was a 19th-century professional baseball outfielder and third baseman.  He continued to play in the minor leagues through 1888.

External links

Major League Baseball outfielders
Major League Baseball third basemen
St. Louis Browns (AA) players
Pittsburgh Alleghenys players
Kansas City Cowboys (UA) players
19th-century baseball players
Baseball players from Missouri
1859 births
1889 deaths
Quincy Quincys players
St. Paul Apostles players
Milwaukee Brewers (minor league) players
New Britain (minor league baseball) players
Utica Pent Ups players
Lawrence (minor league baseball) players
Memphis Browns players
Denver (minor league baseball) players
Omaha Omahogs players
Omaha Lambs players
Denver Mountain Lions players
Denver Mountaineers players